Margaret Lewis Norrie State Park is a  state park in Dutchess County, New York in the United States.  The park is located on the east shore of the Hudson River in the Town of Hyde Park and also includes Esopus Island.

Margaret Lewis Norrie State Park is adjacent to Ogden Mills & Ruth Livingston Mills State Park, and the two parks are collectively known as Mills-Norrie State Park.

History
The park's lands were donated to New York State by Geraldine Morgan Thompson in memory of her sister, Margaret Lewis Norrie. A large Civilian Conservation Corps camp existed at the park in 1937, housing workers that were developing the park's facilities.

Nearby state parks and historic sites
 Ogden Mills & Ruth Livingston Mills State Park (Dutchess County)
 James Baird State Park (Dutchess County)
 Staatsburgh State Historic Site (Dutchess County)
 Lake Taghkanic State Park (Columbia County)
 Clermont State Historic Site (Columbia County)
 Olana State Historic Site (Columbia County)

See also

 List of New York state parks

Notes

References

External links
 New York State Parks: Margaret Lewis Norrie State Park

Hyde Park, New York
State parks of New York (state)
Parks on the Hudson River
Parks in Dutchess County, New York